Otis Gibson (Pinyin: Jīshùn; Foochow Romanized: Gĭ-sông; December 8, 1826 – January 25, 1889) was a Methodist pastor, best known for his missionary work to the Chinese in Foochow, China and in San Francisco, California.

Life

Early life

Born on a farm in Moira, New York, Otis Gibson had five brothers and one sister. He was converted at the age of 13 after the sudden death of his brother. When he was 19, he joined the Methodist Episcopal Church. In the early 1850s he attended Dickinson College. Later he became a teacher and went to a Quaker settlement in Maryland to teach, where he met his wife-to-be Eliza Chamberlain.

Shortly before he graduated from college, Otis Gibson decided to go into the ministry and was appointed as a missionary to Foochow. He graduated in June 1854 with a D.D. and was licensed to preach on 4 November the same year. A few months before he and Eliza were sent to China, they got married in a Methodist Camp Meeting.

Missionary work in China
Otis Gibson's ordination was given in 1854, but his scheduled sail had to be postponed till spring the next year because the recording secretary forgot to record the recommendation. On April 3, 1855 Gibson and wife set sail from New York Harbor on a clipper ship bound for Shanghai. On that day Gibson wrote, "Believing that God ordered our course, we feel content and satisfied that all is for the best." Finally they reached Foochow on August 13, 1855, following Gibson's teacher Erastus Wentworth with whom he got acquainted at Dickinson College.

In 1856, Otis Gibson and his Methodist co-laborers established two churches in the city, namely,  and Church of Heavenly Peace, which were the first two Methodist churches built in East Asia. On December 26, 1856, Gibson purchased a place in the South bank of River Min and established there in 1859 a commodious wooden Western-style boarding school for laymen and ministers. In the 1860s Gibson also helped in the translation work of the Bible and other Christian books into the local Foochow dialect.

On June 14, 1857, Otis Gibson and Robert S. Maclay baptized their first convert, a native tradesman named Ting Ang. Some weeks later he and Maclay made an unannounced visit to Ting Ang's house and found no sign of idols.

During his tenure in China, Gibson also started the Methodist mission in Yen-p'ing (today Nanping) in 1864. There Gibson succeeded in renting a small house for use as a chapel, but he was faced with strong opposition. Soon afterwards, he went back with Eliza to the United States, and his work in Yen-p'ing was continued by Nathan Sites and other Methodist missionaries.

Life back in America

Due to his wife Eliza's failing health, Otis Gibson left China with her in 1865 and returned to Moira, New York as a pastor. In 1868 he was assigned to San Francisco, California as superintendent of the Methodist Church's "Chinese Domestic Mission" designed to minister to the swelling number of Chinese immigrants in area of the California Conference. There he learned the Cantonese dialect and opened many missions and churches, including San Francisco, Oakland, Stockton, Salinas, and in the gold fields in the foothills of California, and he also wrote a Chinese-English Dictionary and translated the New Testament into Cantonese. Gibson and his wife had instituted on August 10, 1870 the Women's Missionary Society of the Pacific Coast, enlisting area Methodist women to organize the rescue and protection of exploited Chinese women of the slave trade. By the end of 1870, Rev. Gibson had erected the building of the "Chinese Mission Institute" on Washington Street in San Francisco's Chinatown. In October 1871, Gibson baptized his first convert in America, a young Chinese prostitute named Jin Ho.

In his later life, Otis Gibson made untiring and courageous efforts in behalf of the poor and the wronged of the Chinese on the Pacific Coast. In his landmark work The Chinese in America (唐人在金山) which was published in 1877, Gibson concluded his polemic against the anti-Chinese arguments with a noble restatement of the American ideal:

Otis Gibson was strongly anti-Catholic.  

While attending a preachers meeting in 1884 Gibson was stricken with paralysis. He died in San Francisco after a long illness on January 25, 1889, at the home of his son.  His funeral service was attended by Chinese, Japanese, and American friends, and he was buried at the Odd Fellows cemetery.

Family life
Otis Gibson and Eliza had two sons while in China. One died in infancy. The other son, William F. Gibson, became an attorney; represented in 1885 a Chinese couple in San Francisco who filed a landmark lawsuit against the school superintendent for barring their American-born daughter from attending public school; and died in 1902 at age 46.  Only daughter was Myra Alice Gibson.

Legacy
Otis Gibson started in 1868 the first Methodist ministry to the Chinese in America with a mission in San Francisco. The great 1906 earthquake and fire destroyed Gibson's Washington Street building that housed the Chinese Mission, along with most of San Francisco Chinatown. In 1911, after five years of displacement and fund raising, the Chinese Methodist Church was rebuilt on the corner of Washington and Stockton Streets. 

Otis Gibson was also the first pastor to the Japanese on the Pacific coast. When the first Japanese church in America was dedicated in San Francisco in 1894, he was memorialized in the west window stain glass of the Japanese Church on Pine Street.

See also
 Women's Missionary Society of the Pacific Coast
 Charles Goodall Lee
William Speer (minister)

References

American expatriates in China
Converts to Methodism
1826 births
1889 deaths
Methodist missionaries in China
Christian missionaries in Fujian
Dickinson College alumni
People from Moira, New York
American Methodist missionaries